Amos Ali (born 21 August 1975) is a Papua New Guinean sprinter. He competed in the men's 200 metres at the 1996 Summer Olympics.

References

External links

1975 births
Living people
Athletes (track and field) at the 1996 Summer Olympics
Papua New Guinean male sprinters
Olympic athletes of Papua New Guinea